Flacăra (Romanian for "The Flame") is a weekly literary magazine published in Bucharest, Romania.

History and profile
Flacăra was started in 1911. The first issue was published on 22 October 1911. The founder was Constantin Banu and the magazine covers the articles on the literary work by Romanian writers. The headquarters is in Bucharest. During the Ceauşescu era it was a communist publication, and supported the isolation of Romania from Europe together with other magazines.

Following the Romanian Revolution of December 1989 George Arion was elected as the editor-in-chief of the magazine.

Flacăra launched its website in 2010.

See also
 List of magazines in Romania

References

External links
 Official website

1911 establishments in Romania
Communist magazines
Eastern Bloc mass media
Magazines established in 1911
Magazines published in Bucharest
Romanian-language magazines
Literary magazines published in Romania
Political magazines published in Romania
Weekly magazines published in Romania